Richard Hargreaves Duckworth (14 September 1882 – Q3 1965) was an English footballer who played as a wing half for Manchester United, with whom he won the Football League twice and the FA Cup once.

Career
Born in Manchester, he played for Smedley Road School and as a youth player for Harpurhey Wesleyan Juniors, Rossall Mission and Stretford. His first professional contract was with Newton Heath Athletic, who paid him 7 shillings and sixpence a week. As a centre-forward, he scored twice against the Manchester United reserves, and he was signed by the club in October 1903. He scored on his debut, a 4–2 win over Gainsborough Trinity on 19 December 1903. Although he played at right-half in the match, it was not until after a reserve team derby against Manchester City on Christmas Day 1903 that he was considered for the position on a regular basis. In 1904–05, he scored six goals in eight league appearances, his best goal return in a season.

By the 1906–07 season, Duckworth became Manchester United's regular right-half, forming an effective partnership with Charlie Roberts and Alex Bell. The following year, the club won their first major honour, the First Division title, and followed it up with the FA Cup a year later and another league title in 1911. In total, Duckworth scored 11 goals in 254 appearances for Manchester United. A severe knee injury meant he played his final game for the club against Middlesbrough on 15 November 1913, though he remained on their books until 1915. He was also part of a Football Association representative team on a tour of South Africa in 1910, and made five appearances for the Football League XI.

Personal life
After his retirement, Duckworth became a pub licensee, operating the Queen's Arms in Manchester as well as others in Bury, Royton, Castleton, Edenfield and Bacup. In 1949, while working in Edenfield, his 1909 FA Cup winner's medal, which he had lost 20 years earlier, was found in a pile of rubble at a hotel he had once managed. His death was registered in Rochdale in the third quarter of 1965. His son, also called Dick, was also a professional footballer who was on the books of Manchester United before playing in the Football League for Chesterfield, Rotherham United and York City; he later managed York, as well as Stockport County, Darlington and Scunthorpe United.

Career statistics

Honours

Club
Manchester United
First Division (2): 1907–08,  1910–11
FA Cup (1): 1908–09

References
Bibliography

Footnotes

1882 births
Year of death missing
People from Collyhurst
English footballers
Association football wing halves
Manchester United F.C. players
English Football League players
English Football League representative players
FA Cup Final players